Lonchodes is a genus of stick insects in the family Phasmatidae and the type genus of the family Lonchodidae and tribe Lonchodini.  Species have a known distribution that includes tropical Asia and the Pacific.

Species
The Phasmida Species File lists:

 Lonchodes abbreviatus (Brunner von Wattenwyl, 1907)
 Lonchodes auriculatus (Brunner von Wattenwyl, 1907)
 Lonchodes beecheyi (Gray, 1835)
 Lonchodes bobaiensis (Chen, 1986)
 Lonchodes brevipes Gray, 1835 - type species
 Lonchodes bryanti Caudell, 1927
 Lonchodes chani (Hausleithner, 1991)
 Lonchodes dalawangsungay Zompro, 2003
 Lonchodes decolyanus Brunner von Wattenwyl, 1907
 Lonchodes denticauda Bates, 1865
 Lonchodes elegans Brunner von Wattenwyl, 1907
 Lonchodes everetti (Kirby, 1896)
 Lonchodes femoralis Brunner von Wattenwyl, 1907
 Lonchodes flavicornis Bates, 1865
 Lonchodes fruhstorferi Brunner von Wattenwyl, 1907
 Lonchodes godama Wood-Mason, 1877
 Lonchodes gracicercatus (Chen & He, 2008)
 Lonchodes gracillimus (Kirby, 1904)
 Lonchodes guangdongensis (Chen & He, 2008)
 Lonchodes hainanensis (Chen & He, 2002)
 Lonchodes histrio (Brunner von Wattenwyl, 1907)
 Lonchodes huapingensis (Bi & Li, 1991)
 Lonchodes imitans Brunner von Wattenwyl, 1907
 Lonchodes incertus (Brunner von Wattenwyl, 1907)
 Lonchodes jejunus (Brunner von Wattenwyl, 1907)
 Lonchodes longipes Brunner von Wattenwyl, 1907
 Lonchodes margaritatus (Brunner von Wattenwyl, 1907)
 Lonchodes mirabilis (Brunner von Wattenwyl, 1907)
 Lonchodes modestus (Brunner von Wattenwyl, 1907)
 Lonchodes myrina Westwood, 1859
 Lonchodes nigriantennatus (Chen & He, 2002)
 Lonchodes normalis Brunner von Wattenwyl, 1907
 Lonchodes obstrictus Brunner von Wattenwyl, 1907
 Lonchodes parvus (Chen & He, 1994)
 Lonchodes paucigranulatus (Chen & Xu, 2008)
 Lonchodes philippinicus Hennemann & Conle, 2007
 Lonchodes praon Westwood, 1859
 Lonchodes reductus Brunner von Wattenwyl, 1907
 Lonchodes sanguineoligatus (Brunner von Wattenwyl, 1907)
 Lonchodes skapanus Brock, 1999
 Lonchodes sospes Brunner von Wattenwyl, 1907
 Lonchodes spectatus Brunner von Wattenwyl, 1907
 Lonchodes spurcus (Brunner von Wattenwyl, 1907)
 Lonchodes supernumerarius Brunner von Wattenwyl, 1907
 Lonchodes tonkinensis Brunner von Wattenwyl, 1907
 Lonchodes verrucifer Wood-Mason, 1876
 Lonchodes viridis Kirby, 1904

See also
 Omiodes: Lonchodes is a synonym.

References

External links

Phasmatodea genera
Phasmatodea of Asia
Lonchodidae